Five Points is a  village in Hereford Township, Berks County, Pennsylvania, United States, located on the Perkiomen Creek near the boundary with Lehigh County. It is named for the intersection of Deer Hill, Five Points, Sigmund, Township, and Weaver Roads. The village of Hereford is located less than two miles to the southeast. It is split between the ZIP codes of Barto 19504, Macungie 18062, and Zionsville 18092. 

There are at least two other places in Berks County named Five Points. One is in Rockland Township and the other is in Alsace and Exeter Townships.

Unincorporated communities in Berks County, Pennsylvania
Unincorporated communities in Pennsylvania